¿Qué te ha dado esa mujer? ( What Has That Woman Given You?) is a 1951 Mexican comedy film directed by Ismael Rodríguez and starring Pedro Infante, Luis Aguilar and Rosa Arenas. It is the sequel to A.T.M. ¡A toda máquina!.

Cast
 Pedro Infante as Pedro Chávez Pérez  
 Luis Aguilar as Luis Macías Valadez  
 Rosa Arenas as Marianela 
 Gloria Mange as Ruth  
 Emma Rodríguez as Doña Angustias  
 Manuel Arvide as Don Antonio  
 Ángel Infante as the commander  
 Manuel Noriega as the priest 
 Carmen Montejo as Yolanda 
 Ricardo Camacho as the male nurse  
 Jorge Casanova as rival lover to Marianela  
 Rogelio Fernández as kidnapper  
 Elodia Hernández as Ruth's mother  
 Mario Humberto Jiménez Pons as Angustias’ son  
 Luis Leal Solares as commander  
 Chel López as doctor  
 Concepción Martínez as the little old lady visiting the apartment  
 Bruno Márquez as the delegate  
 José Pardavé as the ticketed motorist  
 Salvador Quiroz as General  
 Carlos Rincón Gallardo as Angustias’ husband
 Aurora Ruiz as Ruth's mother's servant
 María Luisa Smith as the old lady outside the church
 María Valdealde as the restaurant proprietress  
 Alfredo Varela padre as the hotel manager  
 Manuel Vergara 'Manver' as the drunk driver  
 Acela Vidaurri as Chonita the vendor

References

Bibliography 
 Juanita Heredia. Transnational Latina Narratives in the Twenty-first Century. Palgrave Macmillan, 2009.

External links 
 

1951 comedy films
Mexican comedy films
1950s Spanish-language films
Films directed by Ismael Rodríguez
Mexican sequel films
Mexican black-and-white films
1950s Mexican films